Metrohm AG is an internationally active producer of precision instruments for chemical analysis, in particular ion analysis, based in Herisau, Switzerland. Metrohm is the leading manufacturer of titration devices and one of the two biggest manufacturers of ion chromatography systems. Besides developing, producing and selling analysis instruments, the company develops applications for these, which find use in various industries.

Metrohm employs over 2000 people in total, of whom ca. 560 work at the Herisau site, and as of 2007 generates an annual revenue of about 350 million Swiss Francs.

History
Metrohm was founded in 1943 in Herisau by Bertold Suhner and Willi Studer. At the outset, it produced measuring instruments for high-frequency technology and telecommunications. High-precision measuring instruments as well as radio receivers were added to its portfolio later on.

In 1947, Suhner and Studer parted ways. Swiss journalist and author Peter Holenstein describes how this happened in his book on the lifework of co-founder Willi Studer: In June 1947, Emil Haefely, founder of the company Emil Haefely & Cie AG, which was one of Metrohm's first customers, asked Willi Studer, whom he had known for many years, to build a prototype for a cathode-ray oscilloscope. This being new technology for Metrohm, Bertold Suhner opposed the idea, fearing that the development wouldn't be possible within reasonable time and budget constraints. Indeed, while the development of the simpler instruments in Metrohm's portfolio had never taken Studer more than a few weeks, Studer still hadn't finished the prototype after several months at the end of November 1947. At this point, his colleague Suhner lost all hope that the project would come to a successful conclusion. A break between the co-founders was the result and led Studer to leave the company at the end of December 1947. From then on, Suhner ran the business by himself. Studer, on the other hand, went on to found his own company "Willi Studer", known as Studer today and famous for its audio equipment.

In 1968, Bertold Suhner resigned from his post in the operational management of Metrohm and became strongly committed to the environment. He even fought for causes that could harm his own company, making it a difficult time for the new managing directors Lorenz Kuhn and Hans Winzeler. As a result of his intransigence in environmental matters, he also alienated friends, leaving him socially isolated towards the end of his life.

Since 1982, Metrohm AG has been a full subsidiary of the Metrohm Foundation, which is the only shareholder of Metrohm AG. Metrohm co-founder Bertold Suhner put the foundation in place to ensure independence and thereby maintain the ability to make unswayed decisions. The foundation is however not only dedicated to the operation of Metrohm AG, but also to charitable and cultural purposes. For example, in 1999, the Metrohm Foundation equipped the public gymnasium Kantonsschule Trogen in the Swiss town of Trogen with internet access and more than 100 computer workstations to ensure that the public school can keep up with international standards. It has also endowed a professorship for the research on new materials at the Zurich University of Applied Sciences since 2014.

Until 2006, 36 subsidiaries had been founded. For the most part, these are situated abroad and form a worldwide sales network. Research and development as well as production, however, remain at the Herisau site.

Metrohm AG moved from the town center of Herisau in 2011 to its new premises in the industrial zone “Hölzli”. The new premises were expanded in 2015 to accommodate the growing number of employees. In 2021, a new building with 20,000 square meters and the capacity for 250 extra workplaces will be added to the Metrohm campus on Ionenstrasse.

Product lines

Metrohm develops and sells analysis instruments primarily for four chemical analysis techniques:

 Ion chromatography (IC) – This method is used to determine trace quantities of ions such as sulfate, nitrate, nitrite, phosphate, chloride, fluoride, etc. (anions). IC is available but less commonly used for cations (metal ions) because other techniques, in particular atomic spectroscopy and voltammetry, are better suited for their determination.
 Titrators serve the automatic execution of volumetric analyses. This classic wet-chemical technique remains the method of choice for, among others, the determination of water hardness and the analysis of the water content in organic solvents (Karl Fischer titration).
 Polarography or, more generally, voltammetry denotes those electrochemical analysis methods that involve measuring a current as a function of an applied potential. It is useful for the determination of several important heavy metals in environmental samples and foodstuffs. Voltammetry is also suited for the determination of many organic analytes down to the ultra-trace level.
 Near-infrared and Raman spectroscopy are used as secondary analysis techniques. For primary analysis, one of the above-mentioned chemical measuring techniques or other, physical measuring techniques are used. The use of chemometrics for data analysis is an essential part of NIR spectroscopy.

References 

Technology companies of Switzerland
Laboratory equipment manufacturers
Swiss companies established in 1943
Technology companies established in 1943